Tripotamos may refer to:
Tripotamos (Cataonia), a town of ancient Cataonia, now in Turkey
Tripotamos, Florina, a village in the municipal unit of Meliti, Florina regional unit, Greece
Tripotamos, Imathia, a village in the municipal unit of Veria, Imathia regional unit, Greece
Tripotamos, Kilkis, a village in the municipal unit of Kroussa, Kilkis regional unit, Greece

See also
Tripotamo (disambiguation)